al-Nahda (sometimes represented as Nahda or Ennahda) is the Arab Renaissance in the 19th and 20th century.

al-Nahda may also refer to:

Politics 

 Islamic Renaissance Movement, an Islamic political party in Algeria
 Renaissance Party (Egypt), an Islamic political party in Egypt
 Ennahda, an Islamic political party in Tunisia

Locations 

 al-Nahda, Syria, a village in Hama Governorate, Syria
 Al Nahda, Dubai, a community in eastern Dubai
 al-Nahda, Kuwait, a community in western Kuwait
 Grand Ethiopian Renaissance Dam

Sports 

 al-Nahda Club (Oman), a multisport club in Oman
 al-Nahda Club (Saudi Arabia), an association football club in Saudi Arabia
 Al Nahda SC, a former association football club in Lebanon
 Nahda Club Barelias, an association football club in Lebanon
 Nahdat Berkane, a sports club in Morocco

Education 

 Al Nahda National Schools, a private school in Abu Dhabi